David Toguri (25 October 1933, Vancouver, British Columbia, Canada – 15 November 1997, Toronto, Ontario, Canada) was an award-winning Japanese-Canadian choreographer, director and actor, based for most of his career in the UK. He died of cancer.

Stage choreography credits
The Baker's Wife. Phoenix Theatre. Directed by Trevor Nunn.
Measure for Measure.  Directed by Trevor Nunn.
The Blue Angel.  Directed by Trevor Nunn.
The Rocky Horror Show
Street Scene. London Coliseum for English National Opera.
Pacific Overtures. London Coliseum for English National Opera.
Gulliver's Travels Mermaid Theatre Directed Gerald Frow Sean Kenny 
Many shows at the National Theatre including The Threepenny Opera and The Beggar's Opera and Guys and Dolls (1982) which won the Olivier Award for Best Choreography. He also directed and choreographed the show in Australia in 1986 and returned to the National production for its 1996 revival.
"Pa Pa Can You Hear Me Sing" (1989). A musical in Cantonese, directed by Ho Yi for Spotlight Productions, for the Urban Council, Hong Kong
Blitz! (1990). Playhouse Theatre for the National Youth Theatre.
Maggie May (1992). Royalty Theatre for the National Youth Theatre.

Film and television choreography credits
Peter's Friends (1992) (choreographer)
Memphis Belle (1990) (choreographer)
Mack the Knife (1990) (choreographer) aka The Threepenny Opera
Who Framed Roger Rabbit (1988) (choreographer: UK)
The Little Match Girl (1987) (TV) (choreographer)
Absolute Beginners (1986) (choreographer)
Give My Regards to Broad Street (1984) (choreographer)
Jazzin' for Blue Jean (1984) (V) (choreographer)
Blue Money (1982) (TV) (choreographer)
The Rocky Horror Picture Show (1975) (dance stager)
Eskimo Nell (1975) (choreographer) aka The Ballad of Eskimo Nell
The Wednesday Play (choreographer) (1 episode, 1970)
No Trams to Lime Street (1970) TV Episode (choreographer)
The Devil Rides Out (1968) (choreographer) aka The Devil's Bride (USA)
Rock Follies (1976) (choreographer)

Acting credits
Flower Drum Song Movie . . . dancer
Flower Drum Song Broadway cast Dancer
Flower Drum Song (1961, Palace Theatre) .... Dancer (uncredited)
Chaganog (1964) Edinburgh Festival and subsequently at the Vaudeville Theatre
Charlie Girl (1965) .... Adelphi Theatre
Three Hats for Lisa (1965) (UK) .... Dancer aka One Day in London
Koroshi (1966) (TV) (UK: series title) .... Commander Yamada aka Danger Man: Koroshi
You Only Live Twice (1967, aka Ian Fleming's You Only Live Twice (USA: complete title) .... Assassin in Bedroom 
Shinda Shima (1968, TV Episode) .... Commander Yamada
Danger Man (1 episode, 1968) aka Secret Agent aka Danger Man (USA: video box title) .... Commander Yamada
There's a Nasty Word (1969, TV Episode – Love) .... Ibuki
The Troubleshooters (1969, 1 episode, - aka Mogul (USA) ....  Ibuki
Welcome to the Club (1971) .... Hideki Ikada
Rentadick (1972) .... Japanese
Soft Beds, Hard Battles (1974) .... A.D.C. to Prince Kyoto (uncredited)
Eskimo Nell (1975, aka The Ballad of Eskimo Nell) .... Kung Fu Artist 
The Pounds Sterling (1976, TV Episode) .... Alan Nagouchi
Rock Follies (1 episode, 1976) .... Alan Nagouchi 
Dead Man's Kit (1980, TV Episode) .... Chinese laundry man
Armchair Thriller (1 episode, 1980) .... Chinese laundry man
Alicja (1982, aka Alice) .... Duchess (final film role)

External links
 
The Independent Obituary https://www.independent.co.uk/news/obituaries/obituary-david-toguri-1287171.html

Canadian male television actors
Canadian choreographers
1933 births
1997 deaths
20th-century Canadian male actors